The King's High School (also called simply King's High or KHS) is a private day school for girls on the Banbury Road, Warwick, England. One of its main feeder schools is Warwick Preparatory School, which takes girls from the ages of 3 to 11 and boys up to the age of 7.

History
Plans for a girls' school in Warwick were drawn up as long ago as 1875, but the school could not get underway until 1879. In this year boys from The King's School, Warwick, later to become known as Warwick School, who were being taught in Landor House, the modern site of the girls' school and the birthplace of the poet Walter Savage Landor, finally moved to their new buildings south of the River Avon. KHS, The Squirrels (the nickname of the Prep School) and Warwick School now form the Warwick Schools Foundation. The King's High School for Girls has suffered throughout its history from being very short of space, and, since its foundation, has taken over the buildings of two neighbouring schools. The premises of one of them, the former King's Middle School (which was only in existence from 1875 to 1906), caught fire in 1970.

There are now brand new buildings, including a new sixth form building, completed in 2006, on the former Middle School site. It was opened in December 2006 by Dame Judi Dench, new Art, Music and DT facilities, and new refurbished dining room. The school no longer has the lease on the former St Peter's Chapel, known as the Eastgate, situated at the top of Smith Street.

Increasing levels of co-operation between Warwick School and King's High School for Girls has led to the joint teaching of certain AS Level and A Level subjects from September 2004, for example drama, physical education and most recently politics. Girls have been also admitted since 2003 to the Warwick School Combined Cadet Force, founded in 1948.  In the same year a former sixth former and former head girl, Alice Woodhouse, received Young Human Rights Reporter of the Year. A group of girls, also, successfully swam across the English channel in 2012.

In September 2016 it was announced that the school would move to a new £30 million development adjacent to Warwick School and the Prep School on Myton Road. The school was named West Midlands Independent Secondary School of the Year 2019 by the Sunday Times Parent Power School Guide. The school opened its doors at the new site in September 2019.

Headmistresses/Head Masters
1879–1895 M Fisher
1896–1913 M Lea
1913–1921 E M Edgehill
1921–1922 G Gargner
1922–1944 V E L Doorly
1945–1947 G M Wiseman
1948–1970 W Hare
1970–1987 M Leahy
1987–2001 J M Anderson
2001–2015 E S Surber
2015–2020 R Nicholson
2021–present S Burley

Notable former pupils

 Dr Barbara Ansell (1923–2001), UK founder of pediatric rheumatology.
 Catherine Bott (b. 1952), Soprano Singer and Radio Presenter
 Dr Helen Castor (b. 1968), historian, author and formerly a lecturer at University of Cambridge
Professor Emma Dench, the McLean professor of ancient and modern history, Harvard University
 Kim Hartman (b. 1952), actress, most notably Private Helga Geerhart in 'Allo 'Allo!.
 Nadia Parkes (b. 1995), The Spanish Princess and Domina (TV series) actress
 Lucy Rose (b. 1989), Indie/folk singer-songwriter
 Professor Dame Julia Slingo DBE (b. 1950), Met Office Chief Scientist
 June Tabor (b. 1947), Folk singer
 Sophie Turner (b. 1996), Game of Thrones actress
 Gemma Whelan (b. 1981), Game of Thrones actress
 Elizabeth Walker (b. 1972), Circuit Judge and Designated Family Judge for Coventry and Warwickshire.

References

External links
 The King's High Website

Girls' schools in Warwickshire
Private schools in Warwickshire
Organisations based in England with royal patronage
Buildings and structures in Warwick
Educational institutions established in 1879
1879 establishments in England
Member schools of the Girls' Schools Association